Damien Gore (born 1999) is an Irish Gaelic footballer who plays for West Cork Junior Championship club Kilmacabea and at inter-county level with the Cork senior football team. He usually lines out as a left corner-forward.

Honours

Cork Institute of Technology
Trench Cup (1): 2020

Kilmacabea
South West Junior A Football Championship (3): 2017, 2018, 2020

Cork
National Football League Division 3 (1): 2020
All-Ireland Under-20 Football Championship (1): 2019
Munster Under-20 Football Championship (1): 2019

References

1999 births
Living people
Kilmacabea Gaelic footballers
CIT Gaelic footballers
Cork inter-county Gaelic footballers